Monterey '66 is a live album by American jazz pianist Randy Weston recorded in 1966 at the Monterey Jazz Festival but not released on the Verve label until 1994.

Reception

Allmusic awarded the album 4½ stars, with its review by Al Campbell stating: "All compositions are Weston originals and feature a strong African thematic influence. The 25-minute heated finale is the percussion laden 'African Cookbook,' in which everyone contributes strong and inspired soloing". The JazzTimes review by Bill Shoemaker said: "In a program containing some of Weston's most well-loved compositions Monterey '66 reveals the working of one of the great unherealded bands of the '60s and the sublime chemistry that existed between Weston and Booker Ervin".

Track listing 
All compositions by Randy Weston
 Introduction by Jimmy Lyons - 0:49   
 "The Call" - 2:18   
 "Afro Black" - 14:24   
 "Little Niles" - 6:50   
 "Portrait of Vivian" - 10:26   
 "Berkshire Blues" - 6:52   
 "Blues for Strayhorn" - 7:17   
 "African Cookbook" - 25:27

Personnel 
Randy Weston - piano
Ray Copeland - trumpet, flugelhorn, arranger
Booker Ervin - tenor saxophone - feature track 5
Cecil Payne - baritone saxophone
Bill Wood - bass
Lennie McBrowne - drums
Big Black - percussion

References 

Randy Weston live albums
1994 live albums
Verve Records live albums
Albums recorded at the Monterey Jazz Festival